Russo is a village and former municipality in the district of Locarno in the canton of Ticino, Switzerland.

In 1995 the municipality was merged with the other, neighboring municipalities Comologno and Crana to form a new and larger municipality Onsernone.

History
Russo is first mentioned in 1231 as de Ruxi.  In 1277 it was mentioned as Rusio.

During the Ancien Régime, Russo belonged to the Squadra of Russo, part of the old municipality of Onsernone.

The parish was probably created in 1656, when it separated from Loco.  It included Comologno until 1715, Vergeletto until 1757, and Crana until 1787.  The parish church of S. Maria Assunta is first mentioned in 1365, and was renovated in 1995-2002.

Until about the mid-20th Century, agriculture, animal husbandry and straw plaiting were the main sources of income in the village.  This was supplemented by the traditional seasonal migration.  While the number of inhabitants had decreased consistently over the decades, it began increasing in the 1970s.  In 1989, the opening of the Centro sociale onsernonese nursing home provided a few dozen jobs in the village.

Historic population
The historical population is given in the following table:

References

Former municipalities of Ticino
Villages in Onsernone